Virtus Bergamo Alzano Seriate 1909 was an Italian association football club from Alzano Lombardo, Lombardy. In 2019 it was bought by Ciserano Calcio.

History

Alzano Seriate 
FC AlzanoCene officially merged with fellow Lombardy and Serie D side Aurora Seriate Calcio on 31 May 2015 to become Alzano Seriate 1909.

The football in Alzano before the merger

Foot-Ball Club Alzano 
The origins of football in Alzano go back to 1909 when was founded Foot-Ball Club Alzano.

Alzano 1909 Virescit F.C. 
In the summer 1993 was founded Alzano 1909 Virescit Football Club  with the merger between Foot-Ball Club Alzano, from Alzano Lombardo, and Centro Giovanile Virescit Boccaleone, a club from Bergamo, which enjoyed some success in its Serie C1 period in the 1980s.

The new club started from Serie D in 1993 and obtained two consecutive promotions that brought it to play Serie C1. Alzano then won Serie C1/A in 1999, placing first ahead of Como. The Serie B experience for Alzano however lasted only one season, as the team relegated back to Serie C1 the next year. The club then relegated to Serie C2 in 2003 and was successively cancelled by the federation because of financial troubles.

A.S.D F.C. Alzano 1909 
The club was refounded in 2004 as A.S.D F.C. Alzano 1909, the side played for three seasons in Prima Categoria Lombardy.

AlzanoCene 
The club was refounded in the summer 2007 with the merger between A.S.D. Football Club Alzano 1909 (playing in Prima Categoria Lombardy), from Alzano Lombardo and Ardens Cene (playing in Eccellenza Lombardy) from Cene. In the season 2007–08 it was promoted from Eccellenza Lombardy to Serie D.

The football in Cene before the merger

From U.S. Cene to Ardens Cene 
The origins of football in Cene go back to 1947 when was founded U.S. Cene which in 1965 was refounded as Ardens Cene.

Colors and badge 
It's official colours are white and black. It's badge is similar to FC Barcelona.

Honours 
 Serie C1:
 Winners (1): 1998–99
 Serie C2:
 Winners (1): 1984–85
 Serie D:
 Winners (1): 1983–84, 1994-95
Coppa Italia Serie C:
 Winners (1): 1985–86, 1997-98

References

External links 
None currently available.

 
Football clubs in Lombardy
Association football clubs established in 2007
Serie B clubs
Serie C clubs
Serie D clubs
2007 establishments in Italy
Virtus Bergamo
Phoenix clubs (association football)